Venezuela competed at the 1972 Summer Olympics in Munich, West Germany. 23 competitors, 20 men and 3 women, took part in 27 events in 4 sports.

Athletics

Men's 100 metres
Felix Mata
 First Heat — 10.73s (→ did not advance)

Men's 400 metres
Eric Phillips
 Heat — 46.74 (→ did not advance)

Men's 800 metres
Héctor López
 Heat — 1:50.8 (→ did not advance)

Men's 4 × 100 m Relay
Humberto Galea, Felix Mata, Alberto Marchan, and Jesus Rico
 Heat — 39.74s
 Semifinals — 39.74s (→ did not advance)

Boxing

Men's Light Flyweight (– 48 kg)
 Francisco Rodriguez
 First Round — Lost to Dennis Talbot (AUS), KO-2

Men's Light Middleweight (– 71 kg)
Alfredo Lemus
 First Round — Bye
 Second Round — Lost to Emeterio Villanueva (MEX), 1:4

Shooting

Two male shooters represented Venezuela in 1972.

25 m pistol
 Víctor Francis

50 m rifle, prone
 Agustin Rangel

Swimming

Men's 100m Freestyle
Jorge van Baien
 Heat — 57.20s (→  did not advance)

Men's 200m Freestyle
Gerardo Vera
 Heat — 1:57.33 (→  did not advance)

References

External links
Official Olympic Reports

Nations at the 1972 Summer Olympics
1972 Summer Olympics
1972 in Venezuelan sport